Deryaz (also Romanized as Deryāz; also known as Deryās) is a village in Mokriyan-e Gharbi Rural District, in the Central District of Mahabad County, West Azerbaijan Province, Iran. At the 2006 census, its population was 1,605, in 300 families.

References 

Populated places in Mahabad County